Thomas Rees (born 11 September 1984) is an ex-international rugby union footballer who played flanker for London Wasps and represented England at senior, Under-21, Under-19, Under-18 and Under-16 levels as well as sevens. He announced his retirement due to persistent injuries on 10 March 2012.

Career

Born 11 September 1984 in London, Rees began playing rugby at Harriet Costello Secondary School (now The Costello School) in 1996. He also joined the youth team at Basingstoke RFC the following year. Under the guidance of Andy Bloodworth (of Chineham RFC) and Dave Luff, Rees progressed in the sport, initially playing in the centre before eventually specialising at openside flanker. Rees was eventually selected for England U16s, where he was awarded player of the year, and which led to his receiving offers from many Rugby-playing grammar schools: he chose to attend The Royal Grammar School in High Wycombe. Rees went on to play for England U18s and then U19s, being the first-choice openside flanker in both sides. He then signed for London Wasps on an academy contract, and after two years and having just broken into the first team, he was offered a first team contract, which he re-signed on a two-year deal.

With Wasps he won both the Heineken Cup in 2007 and the 2008 Guinness Premiership title, scoring a try in the latter final.

He returned to action on 27 March 2010 against Northampton, which ended 14 9 to Northampton but this followed wins over Gloucester, Worcester and London Irish.

On 10 March 2012, Rees was forced to retire from Rugby on the advice he received after sustaining a knee injury.

As of May 2020, Rees is a doctor at Basingstoke and North Hampshire Hospital, having studied at Imperial College London.

Representative career

Rees captained the England U21 side in the Six Nations Championship but was not selected for the elite England squad for the 2005 autumn internationals due to a knee injury sustained during the 2005 Zurich Premiership semi-finals.

Rees represented England A against Ireland A in early 2006.

Rees had a string of injuries during the 2005–06 season, but on his return put in strong performances at Wasps and was granted his place in the full England squad after representing England at all age groups possible.

Rees made his full England debut on 3 February 2007 against Scotland, coming on as a substitute for Joe Worsley. Rees started his first game in the 26–18 victory against France on 11 March 2007 and was awarded the RBS Man of The Match Award by Brian Moore. Rees also started the next game against Wales.

Rees made his World Cup debut in England's initial group game against USA. Despite England under performing Rees was signalled out along with back Olly Barkley as two positives from the victory. Rees' second half try in that game put him second behind Nigel Redman as England's youngest try scoring forward during a World Cup Finals event. Despite starting in the following game against South Africa Rees failed to make another appearance during the 2007 World Cup. A thigh injury kept him out of the matches against Tonga and Samoa and during this time Lewis Moody claimed the number 7 shirt for the remainder of the tournament.

Despite a supposed lack of form for his club side London Wasps since his return from the World Cup, Rees made Brian Ashton's 32-man training squad for the 2008 Six Nations and earned a place on the bench for the Six Nations opener against Wales ahead of other open-side specialists Michael Lipman and Magnus Lund.

Rees' strong form towards the end of the 2007–08 Guinness Premiership saw him selected to travel to New Zealand to represent England in a two-test summer tour. He was then selected to start the first test at number 7 on 14 June 2008, a game which England lost 37–20. Despite England's defeat, Rees had put in a decent performance in that match. Rees was picked to start the second test in Christchurch on 21 June 2008. England were thumped 44–12; however, Rees again put in a performance he could be proud of against the standout openside in world rugby, Richie McCaw. If Rees' career had not been cut short, he exhibited the potential to make the No.7 shirt his own. There is no doubt the England management would have been compelled to recognise Tom's natural ability as a player and a leader, enhancing the national team's strength and solving the No.7 debate.

International tries

References

External links 
 Guinness Premiership profile
 Wasps profile
 England profile
 Tom Rees photo by sportingheroes.net
 Tom Rees Video – Maximuscle Ambassador

1984 births
Living people
England international rugby union players
English rugby union players
Wasps RFC players
Rugby union flankers
People educated at the Royal Grammar School, High Wycombe
Rugby union players from London